The Serbian Embassy, Washington, D.C. (alternatively, Embassy of Serbia, Washington, D.C.) is the primary diplomatic mission of Serbia to the United States. 

The embassy is located at 1333 16th Street NW, in the Dupont Circle neighborhood of Washington, D.C.. 

The current ambassador of Serbia to the United States is Marko Đurić, since 8 October 2020.

See also
 Serbia–United States relations
 Foreign relations of Serbia
 List of diplomatic missions in Washington, D.C.

References

External links
 Official website 

Serbia
Washington, D.C.
Serbia–United States relations